Robert Jordan Fritz (born 1943 in Cambridge, Massachusetts) is an American author, management consultant, composer, and filmmaker. He is known for his development of structural dynamics, the study of how structural relationships impact behavior from individuals to organizations. His books, starting with The Path of Least Resistance, develop the theory and application of structural dynamics and the creative process.

Bibliography

Media & music 
Overload - 2009 feature film (written and directed by Fritz)
Awards:
Boston International Film Festival - Indie Spirit Special Recognition Award
Los Angeles Reel Film Festival - Honorable Mention
Honolulu Film Festival - Aloha Accolade Award for Excellence in Filmmaking
Los Angeles Cinema Festival of Hollywood - Award of Merit for Narrative Feature
Accolade Competition - Award of Merit
Los Angeles Movie Awards - Award of Excellence (television), Best Original Score, Best Screenplay, Best Actress

Creating - Canadian television series (directed and co-hosted by Fritz)
 Celtic Ladies
The Little Pinecone - Audio CD (Story and music by Fritz)
Elmer's Extraordinary Christmas - Audio CD (Story and music by Fritz)
The Top - Audio CD (Story and music by Fritz)

References

External links 
Robert Fritz Inc

Uganda Rural Development & Training Programme

Living people
1943 births
American management consultants
Writers from Cambridge, Massachusetts
People from Windham County, Vermont
Writers from Vermont
Boston Conservatory at Berklee alumni